Robert Brewis was an English professional footballer who played as a centre forward. He was born in Newcastle-upon-Tyne and played in the Football League with Lincoln City and Burnley, scoring 11 goals in 24 matches.

References

English footballers
Association football forwards
Lincoln City F.C. players
Burnley F.C. players
English Football League players
Year of death missing
Year of birth missing